The highway system in Puerto Rico is composed of approximately  of roads in Puerto Rico, maintained by the Puerto Rico Department of Transportation and Public Works (Spanish: Departmento de Transportación y Obras Públicas) or DTOP. The highway system in Puerto Rico is divided into four networks: primary, urban primary, secondary or inter-municipal, and tertiary or local (Spanish: red primaria, red primaria urbana, red secundaria o intermunicipal, and red terciaria o local). Highways may change between networks and retain their same numbers.

Highway markers

Puerto Rico roads are classified according to the network they belong to. There are four types: primary, urban primary, secondary, and tertiary.

In this regard, a primary road is one which is part of the primary network, an urban primary road is part of the urban primary network, etc. Generally, the same highway may change between networks, but the highway will continue to have the same number. For example, PR-1, connecting Ponce and San Juan, is signed as urban primary inside the Ponce city limits, then it is signed as secondary in Ponce's rural barrio Capitanejo, and then it is again signed as urban primary on its entry into the town of Santa Isabel.

Primary roads are numbered 1 through 99, secondary roads are numbered 100 to 299, and tertiary roads are numbered 300 to 9999. In 2009, primary routes comprise about 14% of the total Commonwealth system mileage, secondary about 30%, and tertiary (municipal) about 56% of the total mileage.

Less common markers

At least two other markers can be observed in Puerto Rico roads today (2019). The first is the older style road marker which, above the route number, also had the outline of the main island of Puerto Rico with the words Puerto Rico on the outline as shown here. Until 1999, all non-tolled numbered highways in Puerto Rico had the same route marker, a square with a white-on-black half-circle with the route number in the bottom two thirds and a map of Puerto Rico with the words Puerto Rico written inside in the top third. A second road marker, used on the road through El Yunque National Forest, is the brown-colored upside-down trapezoidal marker with the road number on the top two-thirds of the sign and the words Bosque Nacional (national forest) on the bottom one-third, as shown.

Roadway maintenance
All Puerto Rico Highway System roads, regardless of the classification used, are maintained by the centralized, Commonwealth-level, Departmento de Transportación y Obras Públicas (DTOP). Municipal governments are not responsible for maintenance of the Puerto Rico Highway System roads within their territory; whether or not the municipal government is an autonomous government, DTOP is the responsible agency. The DTOP maintains a network of regional offices throughout the island which carry out DTOP work within their multi-municipality region. Municipal governments are only responsible for maintenance of city and town streets within their jurisdictions. On occasion, the central government has entered into memoranda of agreement with municipal governments for the collaborative maintenance of some Puerto Rico Highway System roadways within their municipalities.

Municipal roads
In Puerto Rico, the term municipal road may be encountered occasionally. This is not a “fourth” network of State roads. Roadways that have both their terminus within the same municipality are called tertiary roads and are, by convention, numbered PR-300 through PR-9999. Tertiary roads are also sometimes called Carreteras de la red local (English: Local network roads).

However, the term municipal road or municipal highway (Spanish: Carretera municipal) refers to any public roadway that is not marked with a Puerto Rico road marker. Roadways marked with a Puerto Rico road marker are those public roadways that include PR followed by a number in its markers. Such roads are considered State roads and part of the Puerto Rico Highway System. Public roadways that do not include such markings are termed municipal roadways. Unlike State roads, which are signed with numbers, municipal roads are signed with names, such as Calle Hostos, Calle De Diego, Calle San Jorge, Calle León M. Acuña.

Tertiary roads are not municipal roads even though at times the term municipal road has been used (as a shortcut to intra-municipal road)—even by the Government of Puerto Rico—to refer to a tertiary State road. The confusion comes from the context in which the phrase municipal road occurs. When the term municipal road occurs in the context of roads owned and maintained by the State government, municipal roads means tertiary State network roads. In this context, a municipal road and a State tertiary road both refer to the same network of State roads. However, if the term occurs in the context of roadways owned and maintained by a municipal government, it refers to the network of local streets and roadways that make up the urban landscape of a municipality.

Another context sometimes encountered is the context of how a road is used, that is, the purpose of a road. The purpose of a road is indicative of whether a road is a municipal road or not. In its strictest meaning, the term municipal roads refers to roads within a municipality's urban center that provide access from one urban neighborhood to another urban neighborhood within the same urban area (city, town, poblado, etc.), while in the larger context of the State highway system, municipal roads refers to roads that “provide access to the main urban area of a municipality from peripheral communities” (that is, tertiary roads). Municipal roads are maintained by the municipal government where those roads occur, while tertiary roads are maintained by the State government. As stated under the section Road maintenance, at times the State government has entered into Memorandums of Agreement with municipal governments for the upkeep of a State tertiary roadway (note this is a State-owned road that runs entirely within a single municipality), but this does not make it a municipal road—the road continues to maintain its State signage and ownership.

Expressways

Highways with control access fall into three types: An expressway is an arterial highway with full or partial control of access. Expressways with full control of access are termed freeways. Toll roads between San Juan and Arecibo, and between San Juan and Ponce were envisioned by J. Raymond Watson, a Puerto Rican engineer, in 1970.

All Puerto Rico expressways are signed either as primary or as urban primary routes.

List of highways
Below is a list of some highways in Puerto Rico along with the municipalities where they begin and end.

Primary highways
Primary roads are numbered in the 1 to 99 range and are distributed randomly throughout the island.

Secondary highways
Secondary roads are numbered in the 100 to 299 range. Unlike primary highways, which are numbered randomly throughout the island, secondary highways generally follow a grid pattern. They begin from the southwest portion of the island with PR-100 and increase in number as you progress in a northeasterly fashion. PR-100 is located in the southwestern town of Cabo Rojo, whilst PR-198 is in Juncos, Las Piedras and Humacao in the eastern part of Puerto Rico. The highest secondary highway number assigned so far (February 2014) is 252 (PR-252), located in the northeastern municipality-island of Culebra. A few roads “violate” this grid order; for example, PR-199 lies in Guaynabo and San Juan.

Tertiary highways
Tertiary highways also follow a general grid. Towns which do not border the Atlantic Ocean or the Caribbean Sea, especially in the mountainous area, may overlap this grid, for example Ciales may have both highways in the 600-699 grid and the 500-599 grid, depending where they begin further north or further south. Generally along the areas where the highways are, the lower the number, the more south it is. Culebra is the only town in Puerto Rico that does not fall in any of the regions, for only PR-250 and PR-251 are the main routes. The entire immediate metropolitan area of San Juan with the exception of Caguas falls in the 800 region, while the entire east coast (north and south) east of San Juan, Caguas and Patillas fall in the 900 region. This is because the eastern portion of Puerto Rico has a southeastern coast which goes to the west from Humacao, which roughly defines where the Vieques Passage and the Caribbean Sea meet along the coast. Yabucoa is in the exact south-southeast area and lies in the 900 region, while Maunabo overlaps the 700's and 900's regions. Vieques, an offshore island-municipality, has some highways in the 900 order.

Some roads are numbered using four digits. For example, PR-5506. These are branches, or spurs, of tertiary roads by the same last three digit number. Thus, PR-5506 is a branch of PR-506. They are often dead end branches, and are common in the mountain regions of the main island. Sometimes they are loops branching off the main road and eventually connecting back to the same main tertiary road. The “fourth” digit is generally a repeat of the first digit of the main tertiary road in question. Thus, a branch of PR-301 would be signed PR-3301, with the added 3 prefixing the number of the main tertiary road associated with the spur, 301, because 3 is the first digit of the main road. When the road has more than one distinct spur, an additional unrelated digit is used (example, PR-4301).

Interstates

There are no Interstate-signed highways in Puerto Rico, but there are roadways that have received up to 90% of their funding from the US Interstate Highway System. Still, at least as of 2007, none of such highways funded by the Interstate Highway program were planned or built to the standards of the Interstate Highway System. As of March 2001, Puerto Rico had  of such roadways. As of 2001, there were three highways in Puerto Rico funded under the Interstate Highway Program. For obvious reasons, these routes—as with Interstate Highways in Alaska and Interstate Highways in Hawaii—do not connect to the Interstate Highway System in the contiguous United States.

Like Interstate routes in Alaska, Puerto Rico Interstate routes are unsigned. For administrative and funding purposes, the three routes have been designated as PRI-1, PRI-2 and PRI-3 and run along various combinations of Puerto Rico routes. They do not follow the even-and-odd-number rule used in mainland United States that indicates direction of travel. Per Section 103(c)(1)(B) (ii), Title 23, United States Code (23 U.S.C.) Puerto Rico is exempt from the design standards of Section 109(b).

Puerto Rico's Interstate routes should not be confused with Puerto Rico Routes PR-1, PR-2, and PR-3, which are other major highways in Puerto Rico.

See also

 
 List of highways in Ponce, Puerto Rico
 1953 Puerto Rico highway renumbering

Notes

References

External links
 2020 Manual de Rotulación para las Vías Públicas de Puerto Rico 
 Puerto Rico Road Photos

Highways